Veronica ovata is a species of flowering plant in the family Plantaginaceae. It is native to eastern Asia, including eastern China, Korea, and Japan.

Subspecies
Kew's Plants of the World Online database accepts the following subspecies:
 V. o. subsp. japonica
 V. o. subsp. kiusiana
 V. o. subsp. maritima
 V. o. subsp. miyabei
 V. o. subsp. ovata

Other subspecies include:
 V. o. canescens
 V. o. villosa

References

ovata
Flora of Asia